Saja is a town and ward in Wanging'ombe District in the Njombe Region of the Tanzanian Southern Highlands. The population of the ward, according to the 2002 Tanzanian census, was 10,004.

References

Wards of Njombe Region